Bruce Lindsay Eddis (born 17 August 1883 in Calcutta, Bengal, India; died 12 May 1966 in Maidenhead, Berkshire, England) was an English first-class cricketer. He played several matches for the Straits Settlements, against the Federated Malay States and Hong Kong, before playing a first-class match for a combined Army/Navy team at Lord's in August 1919. He later played twice for the Marylebone Cricket Club (MCC) against Ireland in August 1926. His brother, Basil Eddis, also played first-class cricket.

References

1883 births
1966 deaths
English cricketers
Straits Settlements cricketers
Army and Navy cricketers
British people in colonial India
British people in British Malaya